Events from the year 1737 in Japan.

Incumbents
Monarch: Sakuramachi

Deaths
 May 10 - Emperor Nakamikado (b. 1702)

References

 
1730s in Japan
Years of the 18th century in Japan